Victorian morality is a distillation of the moral views of the middle class in 19th-century Britain, the Victorian era.

Victorian values emerged in all classes and reached all facets of Victorian living. The values of the period—which can be classed as religion, morality, Evangelicalism, industrial work ethic, and personal improvement—took root in Victorian morality. Current plays and all literature—including old classics like Shakespeare—were cleansed of content considered to be inappropriate for children, or "bowdlerized".

Contemporary historians have generally come to regard the Victorian era as a time of many conflicts, such as the widespread cultivation of an outward appearance of dignity and restraint, together with serious debates about exactly how the new morality should be implemented. The international slave trade was abolished, and this ban was enforced by the Royal Navy. Slavery was ended in all the British colonies, child labour was ended in British factories, and a long debate ensued regarding whether prostitution should be totally abolished or tightly regulated. Homosexuality remained illegal.

Slavery

Opposition to slavery was the main evangelical cause from the late 18th century, led by William Wilberforce (1759–1833). The cause organized very thoroughly, and developed propaganda campaigns that made readers cringe at the horrors of slavery. The same moral fervor and organizational skills carried over into most of the other reform movements.  Victoria ascended to the throne in 1837, only four years after the abolition of slavery throughout the British Empire. The anti-slavery movement had campaigned for years to achieve the ban, succeeding with a partial abolition in 1807 and the full ban on slave trading, but not slave ownership, which only happened in 1833. It took so long because the anti-slavery morality was pitted against powerful economic interests which claimed their businesses would be destroyed if they were not permitted to exploit slave labour. Eventually, plantation owners in the Caribbean received £20 million in cash compensation, which reflected the average market price of slaves. William E. Gladstone, later a famous reformer, handled the large payments to his father for their hundreds of slaves.  The Royal Navy patrolled the Atlantic Ocean, stopping any ships that it suspected of trading African slaves to the Americas and freeing any slaves found. The British had set up a Crown Colony in West Africa—Sierra Leone—and transported freed slaves there. Freed slaves from Nova Scotia founded and named the capital of Sierra Leone "Freetown".

Abolishing cruelty

Cruelty to animals

William Wilberforce, Thomas Fowell Buxton and Richard Martin introduced the first legislation to prevent cruelty to animals, the Cruel Treatment of Cattle Act 1822; it pertained only to cattle and it passed easily in 1822.

In the Metropolitan Police Act 1839, "fighting or baiting Lions, Bears, Badgers, Cocks, Dogs, or other Animals" was made a criminal offence.  The law laid numerous restrictions on how, when, and where animals could be used. It prohibited owners from letting mad dogs run loose and gave police the right to destroy any dog suspected of being rabid. It prohibited the use of dogs for drawing carts. The law was extended to the rest of England and Wales in 1854. Dog-pulled carts were often used by very poor self-employed men as a cheap means to deliver milk, human foods, animal foods (the cat's-meat man), and for collecting refuse (the rag-and-bone man). The dogs were susceptible to rabies; cases of the disease among humans had been on the rise. They also bothered the horses, which were economically much more vital to the city. Evangelicals and utilitarians in the Society for the Prevention of Cruelty to Animals persuaded Parliament it was cruel and should be illegal; the Utilitarian element added government inspectors to provide enforcement.  The owners had no more use for their dogs, and killed them. Cart dogs were replaced by people with handcarts.

Historian Harold Perkin writes:

Child labour

Evangelical religious forces took the lead in identifying the evils of child labour, and legislating against them. Their anger at the contradiction between the conditions on the ground for children of the poor and the middle-class notion of childhood as a time of innocence led to the first campaigns for the imposition of legal protection for children. Reformers attacked child labor from the 1830s onward. The campaign that led to the Factory Acts was spearheaded by rich philanthropists of the era, especially Lord Shaftesbury, who introduced bills in Parliament to mitigate the exploitation of children at the workplace. In 1833 he introduced the Ten Hours Act 1833, which provided that children working in the cotton and woollen mills must be aged nine or above; no person under the age of eighteen was to work more than ten hours a day or eight hours on a Saturday; and no one under twenty-five was to work nights. The Factory Act of 1844 said children 9–13 years could work for at most 9 hours a day with a lunch break.  Additional legal interventions throughout the century increased the level of childhood protection, despite the resistance from the laissez-faire attitudes against government interference by factory owners. Parliament respected laissez-faire in the case of adult men, and there was minimal interference in the Victorian era.

Unemployed street children suffered too, as novelist Charles Dickens revealed to a large middle class audience the horrors of London street life.

Sexuality

Historians Peter Gay and Michael Mason both point out that modern society often confuses Victorian etiquette for a lack of knowledge. For example, people going for a bath in the sea or at the beach would use a bathing machine. Despite the use of the bathing machine, it was still possible to see people bathing nude. Contrary to popular conception, however, Victorian society recognised that both men and women enjoyed copulation.

Verbal or written communication of sexual feelings was also often proscribed so people instead used the language of flowers. However, they also wrote explicit erotica, perhaps the most famous being the racy tell-all My Secret Life by the pseudonym Walter (allegedly Henry Spencer Ashbee), and the magazine The Pearl, which was published for several years and reprinted as a paperback book in the 1960s. Victorian erotica also survives in private letters archived in museums and even in a study of women's orgasms. Some current historians now believe that the myth of Victorian repression can be traced back to early twentieth-century views, such as those of Lytton Strachey, a homosexual member of the Bloomsbury Group, who wrote Eminent Victorians.

Homosexuality

The enormous expansion of police forces, especially in London, produced a sharp rise in prosecutions for illegal sodomy at midcentury. Male sexuality became a favorite subject of study especially by medical researchers whose case studies explored the progression and symptoms of institutionalized subjects. Henry Maudsley shaped late Victorian views about aberrant sexuality. George Savage and Charles Arthur Mercier wrote about homosexuals living in society. Daniel Hack Tuke's Dictionary of Psychological Medicine covered sexual perversion. All these works show awareness of continental insights, as well as moral disdain for the sexual practices described.

Simeon Solomon and poet Algernon Charles Swinburne, as they contemplated their own sexual identities in the 1860s, fastened on the Greek lesbian poet Sappho. They made Victorian intellectuals aware of Sappho, and their writings helped to shape the modern image of lesbianism.

The Labouchere Amendment to the Criminal Law Amendment Act 1885, for the first time, made all male homosexual acts illegal. It provided for two years' imprisonment for males convicted of committing, or being a party to public or private acts of homosexuality. Lesbian acts—still scarcely known—were ignored.  When Oscar Wilde was convicted of violating the statute, and imprisoned for such violations, in 1895, he became the iconic victim of English puritanical repression.

Prostitution

Prostitution had been a factor in city life for centuries. The reformers started mobilizing in the late 1840s, major news organisations, clergymen, and single women became increasingly concerned about prostitution, which came to be known as "The Great Social Evil".   Estimates of the number of prostitutes in London in the 1850s vary widely (in his landmark study, Prostitution, William Acton reported that the police estimated there were 8,600 in London alone in 1857).

While the Magdalene asylums had been reforming prostitutes since the mid-18th century, the years between 1848 and 1870 saw a veritable explosion in the number of institutions working to "reclaim" these "fallen women" from the streets and retrain them for entry into respectable society—usually for work as domestic servants. The theme of prostitution and the "fallen woman" (any woman who has had sexual intercourse out of marriage) became a staple feature of mid-Victorian literature and politics. In the writings of Henry Mayhew, Charles Booth, Charles Dickens and others, prostitution began to be seen as a social problem.

When Parliament passed the first of the Contagious Diseases Acts (CD) in 1864 (which allowed the local constabulary in certain defined areas to force any woman suspected of venereal disease to submit to its inspection), Josephine Butler's crusade to repeal the CD Acts yoked the anti-prostitution cause with the emergent feminist movement.  Butler attacked the long-established double standard of sexual morality.

Prostitutes were often presented as victims in sentimental literature such as Thomas Hood's poem The Bridge of Sighs, Elizabeth Gaskell's novel Mary Barton, and Dickens' novel Oliver Twist. The emphasis on the purity of women found in such works as Coventry Patmore's The Angel in the House led to the portrayal of the prostitute and fallen woman as soiled, corrupted, and in need of cleansing.

This emphasis on female purity was allied to the stress on the homemaking role of women, who helped to create a space free from the pollution and corruption of the city. In this respect, the prostitute came to have symbolic significance as the embodiment of the violation of that divide. The double standard remained in force. The Matrimonial Causes Act 1857 allowed for a man to divorce his wife for adultery, but a woman could only divorce for adultery combined with other offences such as incest, cruelty, bigamy, desertion, etc., or based on cruelty alone.

The anonymity of the city led to a large increase in prostitution and unsanctioned sexual relationships. Dickens and other writers associated prostitution with the mechanisation and industrialisation of modern life, portraying prostitutes as human commodities consumed and thrown away like refuse when they were used up. Moral reform movements attempted to close down brothels, something that has sometimes been argued to have been a factor in the concentration of street-prostitution.

The extent of prostitution in London in the 1880s gained national and global prominence through the highly publicised murders attributed to Whitechapel-based serial killer Jack the Ripper, whose victims were exclusively prostitutes living destitute in the East End. Given that many prostitutes were living in poverty as late as the 1880s and 1890s, offering sex services was a source of desperate necessity to fund their meals and temporary lodging accommodation from the cold, and as a result prostitutes represented easy prey for criminals as they could do little to personally protect themselves from harm.

Crime and police

After 1815, there was widespread fear of growing crimes, burglaries, mob action, and threats of large-scale disorder. Crime had been handled on an ad-hoc basis by poorly organized local parish constables and private watchmen, supported by very stiff penalties, including hundreds of causes for execution or deportation to Australia. London, with 1.5 million people—more than the next 15 cities combined—over the decades had worked out informal arrangements to develop a uniform policing system in its many boroughs. The Metropolitan Police Act 1829, championed by Home Secretary Robert Peel, was not so much a startling innovation, as a systemization with expanded funding of established informal practices. It created the Metropolitan Police Service, headquartered at Scotland Yard. London now had the world's first modern police force. The 3000 policemen were called "bobbies" (after Peel's first name). They were well-organized, centrally directed, and wore standard blue uniforms. Legally they had the historic status of constable, with authority to make arrests of suspicious persons and book offenders before a magistrate court. They were assigned in teams to specified beats, especially at night. Gas lighting was installed on major streets, making their task of surveillance much easier.  Crime rates went down. An 1835 law required all incorporated boroughs in England and Wales to establish police forces.  Scotland, with its separate  legal system, was soon added. By 1857  every jurisdiction in Great Britain had an organized police force, for which the Treasury paid a subsidy.  The police had steady pay, were selected by merit rather than by political influence, and were rarely used for partisan purposes. The pay scale was not high (one guinea a week in 1833), but the prestige was especially high for Irish Catholics, who were disproportionately represented in every city where they had a large presence.

Causation

Intellectual historians searching for causes of the new morality often point to the ideas by Hannah More, William Wilberforce, and the Clapham Sect. Perkin argues this exaggerates the influence of a small group of individuals, who were "as much an effect of the revolution as a cause."  It also has a timing problem, for many predecessors had failed. The intellectual approach tends to minimize the importance of Nonconformists and Evangelicals—the Methodists, for example, played a powerful role among the upper tier of the working class.  Finally, it misses a key ingredient: instead of trying to improve an old society, the reformers were trying to lead Britain into a new society of the future.

Victorian era movements for justice, freedom, and other strong moral values made greed, and exploitation into public evils.  The writings of Charles Dickens, in particular, observed and recorded these conditions.  
Peter Shapely examined 100 charity leaders in Victorian Manchester. They brought significant cultural capital, such as wealth, education and social standing. Besides the actual reforms for the city they achieved for themselves a form of symbolic capital, a legitimate form of social domination and civic leadership. The utility of charity as a means of boosting one's social leadership was socially determined and would take a person only so far.

The Marxist intellectual Walter Benjamin connected Victorian morality to the rise of the bourgeoisie. Benjamin alleged that the shopping culture of the petite bourgeoisie established the sitting room as the centre of personal and family life; as such, the English bourgeois culture is a sitting-room culture of prestige through conspicuous consumption. This acquisition of prestige is then reinforced by the repression of emotion and of sexual desire, and by the construction of a regulated social-space where propriety is the key personality trait desired in men and women.

Demystifying  
It seems necessary to clarify that the sense of moral exceptionality shared by Victorians did not come into being the moment that Queen Victoria took to the throne. Before the Victorian era, there had already been some foundation—built upon decades and centuries of evolving ideologies and discourses—for a Victorian culture of dignity, restraint, and moral goodness to emerge. Moreover, just as the Victorians were not the sole originators of the social rules that governed their society and political climate, they were also not beholden to them to the same rigid degree as the modern-day person may think. That is to say, practices on the ground associated with the Victorian era morality—a gendered public and private binary, for example—did not always align with abstract ideals found in contemporary documents and literature. 

In The History of Sexuality philosopher Michel Foucault rejects the notion that power relationships emanate from a single source or have any solid foundation capable of imparting legitimacy. He writes that the viewpoint from which one understands power “must not be sought in the primary existence of a central point, in a unique source of sovereignty from which secondary and descendent forms would emanate” that, rather, power is “the moving substrate of force relations… [that is] always local and unstable.”  Foucault forces a reimagining of power that requires a rejection of normative narratives and blanket analyses of historical eras and entreats us to destabilize entrenched understandings. The established concept of “Victorian morality” seems vulnerable to such a treatment.

See also
 The New Life (2022 historical fiction) by Tom Crewe

References

Further reading

 Adams, James Eli,  ed. Encyclopedia of the Victorian Era (4 vol. 2004). articles by scholars
 Bartley, Paula. Prostitution: Prevention and reform in England, 1860–1914 (Routledge, 2012)
 Boddice, Rob. The Science of Sympathy: Morality, Evolution, and Victorian Civilization (2016)
 Briggs, Asa. The Age of Improvement, 1783–1867 (1959).
 Churchill, David. Crime control and everyday life in the Victorian city: the police and the public (2017).
 Churchill, David C. "Rethinking the state monopolisation thesis: the historiography of policing and criminal justice in nineteenth-century England." Crime, Histoire & Sociétés/Crime, History & Societies 18.1 (2014): 131–152.  online
 Emsley,  Clive.Crime and Society in England, 1750–1900 (5th ed. 2018)
 Fraser, Derek. The evolution of the British welfare state: a history of social policy since the Industrial Revolution (Springer, 1973).
Gay, Peter. The Bourgeois Experience: Victoria to Freud
 Harrison, Brian. "Philanthropy and the Victorians" Victorian Studies 9#4 (1955) 353-374 online
Merriman, J (2004). A History of Modern Europe; From the French Revolution to the Present New York, London: W.W. Norton & Company.
 Perkin, Harold. The Origins of Modern English Society: 1780-1880 (1969)   
 Searle, G. R. Morality and the Market in Victorian Britain (1998)
 Woodward, E. L. The Age of Reform, 1815–1870 (1938); 692 pages; wide-ranging scholarly survey

Morality
Social philosophy
Victorian culture